Royster H. Bullock (June 8, 1890 – May 13, 1941) was an American Negro league pitcher in the 1920s.

A native of Henderson, North Carolina, Bullock played for the Cleveland Tate Stars and the Pittsburgh Keystones in 1921. In six recorded appearances on the mound, he posted a 5.35 ERA over 35.1 innings. Bullock died in Philadelphia, Pennsylvania in 1941 at age 50.

References

External links
Baseball statistics and player information from Baseball-Reference Black Baseball Stats and Seamheads

1890 births
1941 deaths
Cleveland Tate Stars players
Pittsburgh Keystones players
Baseball pitchers
Baseball players from North Carolina
People from Henderson, North Carolina
20th-century African-American sportspeople